Rufus Corbin Wood (May 30, 1818 – July 29, 1885) was sheriff of Norfolk County, Massachusetts from 1878 to 1885.

Early life
Wood was born in Palmer, Massachusetts on May 30, 1818.

Death and burial
Wood died on July 29, 1885. He was buried at the Canton Corner Cemetery in Canton, Massachusetts.

References

19th-century American people
1818 births
1885 deaths
People from Palmer, Massachusetts
People from Canton, Massachusetts
People from Dudley, Massachusetts
High Sheriffs of Norfolk County